Yang Hao (born 3 February 1998) is a Chinese diver. The main events he competes in are the 10m platform and 3m springboard. He competed in the 2014 Summer Youth Olympics at both men's 10m platform and 3m springboard. At the 2014 Summer Youth Olympics, he won gold medals both in men's 10m platform and in men's 3m springboard.

At the 2015 World Aquatics Championships, he became a new world champion in Team China after winning the gold medal of mixed synchronized 3m springboard.

References

 

Chinese male divers
1998 births
Living people
Divers at the 2014 Summer Youth Olympics
World Aquatics Championships medalists in diving
People from Shiping County
Asian Games medalists in diving
Divers at the 2018 Asian Games
Asian Games gold medalists for China
Medalists at the 2018 Asian Games
Youth Olympic gold medalists for China
20th-century Chinese people
21st-century Chinese people